Fury in the Pacific is a 1945 American documentary short film about a pair of World War II battles in the Pacific: the Battle of Peleliu and the Battle of Angaur. It was co-produced by the United States Army, United States Navy, and the United States Marines, and directed by a series of combat cameraman — of whom nine became casualties of the battles they were filming. The film is especially noteworthy for its praise of the fighting abilities of Japanese soldiers (a rarity for American propaganda during World War II), and its fast-paced editing.

The film is sometimes erroneously credited to Frank Capra, but he did not, in fact, direct the film.

Plot summary

Cast
 Richard Carlson as Narrator

Soundtrack

References

External links
 
 

1945 films
American World War II propaganda shorts
Documentary films about World War II
American short documentary films
1945 short films
Black-and-white documentary films
Pacific War films
1945 documentary films
American black-and-white films
Films about the United States Marine Corps
Warner Bros. short films
Japan in non-Japanese culture
1940s English-language films
1940s American films